B-585 Sankt Peterburg (named after Saint Petersburg) is the lead boat of the s of the Russian Navy. Construction of the boat started in December 1997, and she was launched in October 2004. After undergoing a series of sea trials, Sankt Peterburg was commissioned in May 2010. However, the Russian Navy decided not to accept the St. Petersburg class after it was discovered that the boat's propulsion and sonar systems were inadequate. After design corrections the submarine was accepted. In 2014, Sankt Peterburg joined the Northern Fleet.

Background and construction
Sankt Peterburg is first boat of Rubin Design Bureau's Lada class, of which a total of eight were expected to be procured by the Russian Navy. Designed during the 1990s, the St. Petersburg class is intended to be the successor to the larger Kilo class. The Kilo class is considered to be one of the quietest diesel classes in operations, giving rise to the nickname "Black Hole". Among the expected capabilities improvements of the St. Petersburg class over its predecessor were the incorporation of improved anechoic coating (to minimize sonar contact), extended cruise range, and the upgrade to newer weapons for anti-submarine and anti-ship operations. St. Petersburg-class boats can also conduct reconnaissance and defend naval facilities and sea lanes.

Amid a severe shortage of funds experienced during the 1990s following the dissolution of the Soviet Union, the keel of Sankt Peterburg was laid down on 26 December 1997, in Saint Petersburg by Admiralty Shipyard. By 2006, two more of Sankt Peterburgs sister boats, Kronshtadt and Sevastopol had had their keels laid down. Sankt Peterburg was launched on 28 October 2004, to coincide with the 300th anniversary of Sankt Peterburg's founding, before undergoing several sea trials, to validate her systems, until 2009.

As of 25 February 2008, Sankt Peterburg was part of the 13th Brigade of Ships Under Repair and Construction (military unit number 22875), Leningrad Naval Base.

Operational history
On 6 May 2010, Sankt Peterburg was commissioned into the Russian Navy, signalling the official start of her operational service. The boat thereafter underwent combat training with the Baltic Fleet and participated in a naval parade and an exercise. At the same time, she continued sea trials until late 2011.

Despite having been commissioned, in November 2011 the Russian Navy decided that the St. Petersburg class would not be accepted into service, as Sankt Peterburg had fallen far short of requirements during trials. According to Izvestia, the main drawback was the propulsion unit's inability to produce half of the expected power, along with the inefficiency of the sonar system. With the construction of the other two St. Petersburg-class submarines being halted, the Russian Navy ordered additional Improved Kilo-class submarines. The decision to reject the St. Petersburg class was confirmed in February 2012 by Russian Navy Commander-in-Chief Admiral Vladimir Vysotsky, who stated, "The Russian Navy does not need the St. Petersburg in its current form." Sankt Peterburg would remain an experimental prototype.

Sankt Peterburg successfully carried a missile launch in accordance with the combat training schedule in the Barents Sea. The cruise missile was launched from an underwater position at a naval target on 17 November 2016. Tests were successfully finished in December 2018.

Nevertheless, as of 2020, the submarine continued to be used as a test platform for the class and according to one report, was noted not to be fully operational. In April 2020, the boat was reported undergoing new trials in the Baltic to prepare for her return to the Northern Fleet where her role in protecting the SSBN force was described as "vital". Another report in 2020 suggested that her deployment could in future be shifted to the Baltic Fleet. In 2021 it was reported that after years of being used as a "test platform", she was formally "accepted into service".

References

External links
Project 677 Lada class Project 1650 Amur class Diesel-Electric Torpedo Submarine of GlobalSecurity.org
Navy Commander Denied Lada Subs Rejection

Lada-class submarines
Attack submarines
2004 ships
Ships built at Admiralty Shipyard
Submarines of the Russian Navy